Anoncia fasciata is a moth in the family Cosmopterigidae. It is found in California, United States.

References

Cosmopteriginae
Endemic fauna of California
Moths of North America
Moths described in 1907
Fauna without expected TNC conservation status